COMM domain-containing protein 4 is a protein that in humans is encoded by the COMMD4 gene.

References

External links

Further reading